Shadowmoss is a tram stop on the Airport Line of the Manchester Metrolink which opened on 3 November 2014.

The stop is one of the least used on the Metrolink network.

Services
Trams run every 12 minutes north to Victoria and south to Manchester Airport (every 20 minutes before 6 am).

Ticket zones 
Shadowmoss stop is located in Metrolink ticket zone 4.

References

External links

 Metrolink stop information
 Shadowmoss area map
 Light Rail Transit Association
 Airport route map

Tram stops in Manchester